Love Thy Neighbour is a 1973 British comedy film starring Jack Smethurst,  Rudolph Walker, Kate Williams and Nina Baden-Semper, spun off from the television series Love Thy Neighbour. It also marked the last regular film appearance of James Beck as Cyril, prior to his sudden death on 6 August of that year.

Plot
Eddie and Joan Booth, a white couple, live next door to Bill and Barbie Reynolds, who are black. Although Joan and Barbie are best friends, Bill and Eddie are complete opposites. Without their husbands' knowledge, Joan and Barbie enter a "Love Thy Neighbour" competition to win a cruise, but must contend with the problem of their antagonistic husbands. To add to the problems, Joan's mother-in-law is coming to stay, and Barbie's father-in-law is coming from Trinidad.

Cast
 Jack Smethurst as Eddie Booth
 Rudolph Walker as Bill Reynolds
 Nina Baden-Semper as Barbie Reynolds
 Kate Williams as Joan Booth
 Bill Fraser as Mr. Granger
 Charles Hyatt as Joe Reynolds
 Patricia Hayes as Annie Booth	
 Melvyn Hayes as Terry
 Keith Marsh as Jacko
 Tommy Godfrey as Arthur
 Azad Ali as Winston
 Arthur English as Carter
 Andria Lawrence as Norma
 Clifford Mollison	as Registrar
 Lincoln Webb as Charlie
 Norman Chappell as Indian Conductor
 Anna Dawson as Betty
 Bill Pertwee as Postman
 Pamela Cundell as Dolly
 Annie Leake as Lil
 Damaris Hayman as Woman on Bus
 Siobhan Quinlan as Carol
 James Beck as Cyril
 Dan Jackson as Black Groom
 John Bindon as White Groom
 Lesley Goldie as White Bride
 Nosher Powell as Bus Driver
 Michael Sharvell-Martin as Police Constable
 Fred Griffiths as Taxi Driver

Reception
The film was popular at the box office and ranked as the 15th-most-popular of the year in the U.K.
Britmovie wrote: "this dated, politically incorrect tale of bigotries and one-upmanship is sprinkled with ignorant comments and insults that are frequently more laughable than offensive when viewed today."

References

External links

1973 films
1973 comedy films
British comedy films
Hammer Film Productions films
Films shot at EMI-Elstree Studios
Films based on television series
Films set in London
EMI Films films
1970s English-language films
1970s British films